Jean Vallée (born Paul Goeders in Verviers on 2 October 1941 – 12 March 2014, Clermont-sur-Berwinne) was a Belgian songwriter and performer. Vallée was appointed Knight of the Order of the Crown by HM Albert II in 1999.

Career
In 1967 Vallée represented Belgium in the Festival of Rio, where Jacques Brel was a member of the jury. He represented Belgium for the Eurovision Song Contest 1970 with "Viens l'oublier" finishing eighth. He participated a second time in the Eurovision Song Contest 1978 with "L'amour ça fait chanter la vie", ending up second behind the Israeli entry. At the time, it was Belgium's best ever Eurovision finish.

References

External links
 
 

1941 births
2014 deaths
People from Verviers
Walloon people
20th-century Belgian male singers
20th-century Belgian singers
Eurovision Song Contest entrants for Belgium
Eurovision Song Contest entrants of 1970
Eurovision Song Contest entrants of 1978

Knights of the Order of the Crown (Belgium)